Alluxio is an open-source virtual distributed file system (VDFS). Initially as research project "Tachyon", Alluxio was created at the University of California, Berkeley's AMPLab as Haoyuan Li's Ph.D. Thesis, advised by Professor Scott Shenker & Professor Ion Stoica. Alluxio sits between computation and storage in the big data analytics stack. It provides a data abstraction layer for computation frameworks, enabling applications to connect to numerous storage systems through a common interface. The software is published under the Apache License.

Data Driven Applications, such as Data Analytics, Machine Learning, and AI, use APIs (such as Hadoop HDFS API, S3 API, FUSE API) provided by Alluxio to interact with data from various storage systems at a fast speed. Popular frameworks running on top of Alluxio include Apache Spark, Presto, TensorFlow, Trino, Apache Hive, and PyTorch, etc.

Alluxio can be deployed on-premise, in the cloud (e.g. Microsoft Azure, AWS, Google Compute Engine), or a hybrid cloud environment. It can run on bare-metal or in a containerized environments such as Kubernetes, Docker, Apache Mesos.

History
Alluxio was initially started by Haoyuan Li at UC Berkeley's AMPLab in 2013, and open sourced in 2014. Alluxio had in excess of 1000 contributors in 2018, making it one of the most active projects in the data eco-system.

In 2019, Alluxio is ranked as GitHub’s Top 100 Most Valuable Repositories Out of 96 Million. In 2020, Alluxio is ranked as Top 10 Most Critical Java Based Open Source project in the world.

Enterprises that use Alluxio
The following is a list of notable enterprises that have used or are using Alluxio:

See also
 Clustered file system
 Comparison of distributed file systems
 Global Namespace
 List of file systems

References

External links
 

Free and open-source software